The Mbokodo Awards are presented annually by Carol Bouwer Productions to honor South African women who have made contributions to the arts and culture. First awarded in 2012, they are given in multiple categories including literature, visual arts, film, theater, and music.

References

External links 
 Official website
 South African Broadcasting Corporation (SABC) interview with Carol Bouwer

South African film awards
South African music awards
South African literary awards
2012 establishments in South Africa
Women in South Africa
South African theatre awards